Charles "Blackie" Chen or Chen Chien-chou (born 2 May 1977 in Kaohsiung) is a Taiwanese television host, actor, basketball manager, entrepreneur, and a former basketball player. He is also the founder and current chief executive officer of the Taiwanese professional basketball league P. League+.

Career

Basketball

Chen Chien-chou made the Chinese Taipei junior national team when he was 18 and played in the 1995 ABC Under-18 Championship, where they finished 5th.

Although only 190 cm (short for even Taiwanese basketball player standards), Chen played in the paint. He modeled his game after Charles Barkley, also an undersized big man (hence his English name of "Charles Chen"). In 1999, after missing the cut for the Chinese Taipei national basketball team, he played for the B national team at the William Jones Cup.

Later, playing for a club in the Singaporean league (where he led the league in scoring and rebounding), he tore his anterior cruciate ligament for the second time in an accident. His basketball career ended prematurely as a result.

In 2020, along with Taipei Fubon Braves, Formosa Dreamers, Hsinchu Lioneers, and Taoyuan Airape, he founded a Taiwanese professional basketball league, P. League+, serving as the CEO and founder.

Entertainment
Chen became a performing artist, and a host of numerous variety shows. Because of his dark skin, he has come to be known by the nickname "Blackie", it is also because the name rhymes with Jackie Chan, in which they both are trained in judo, which Blackie obtained a blue belt.  He has been in a relationship with Christine Fan for 10 years, before finally getting engaged in 2010. They were married in Taipei on May 7, 2011.

Currently the team leader and head of marketing for the Taiwan Beer Basketball Team, Chen directed a 2008 documentary entitled Attitude on the team's quest to become Super Basketball League champion. The documentary was well received and earned him widespread acclaim and accolades from the Taiwanese film industry. Many consider it the high-water mark of Taiwanese sports related documentary films.

Chen is also a television personality and host for several television shows. He is slated to play Peng Dehuai in the highly anticipated miniseries Untold Stories of 1949, to be produced for HBO Asia.

Chen, along with his wife Christine Fan, are also the co-founder and spokespeople for the Love Life campaign, after becoming a Christian, as influenced by her mother-in-law while Christine was recovering from severe depression and mild anorexia.

Filmography

Film

Television series

Variety show host
Channel [V] Pai Pai Zou
asia+ Trivia Party
Channel [V] Hei Se Hui Mei Mei()
Channel [V] - 青春全员集合
Sanlih E-Television - 超級接班人

See also
 Hei Se Hui Mei Mei

References

1977 births
Living people
Taiwanese people of Hakka descent
People from Meixian District
Taiwanese male film actors
Taiwanese men's basketball players
Sportspeople from Kaohsiung
VJs (media personalities)
Hakka musicians
Hakka sportspeople
21st-century Taiwanese male actors
Male actors from Kaohsiung
Taiwan Beer basketball players
Super Basketball League players